Fahad Al-Dhanhani (Arabic: فهد الظنحاني) (born 3 September 1991) is an Emirati footballer. He currently plays as a goalkeeper for Baniyas.

International
He made his debut for the United Arab Emirates national football team on 26 March 2019 in a friendly against Syria.

External links

References

Emirati footballers
1991 births
Living people
United Arab Emirates international footballers
Fujairah FC players
Al Wahda FC players
Dibba FC players
Baniyas Club players
UAE Pro League players
Association football goalkeepers